Faiza Mokdar (born 16 July 2001) is a French judoka. She is a three time junior European champion and a one time cadet European champion.

On 12 November 2022 she won a gold medal at the 2022 European Mixed Team Judo Championships as part of team France.

References

External links
 
 
 

2001 births
Living people
French female judoka
21st-century French women